Merkendorf is a town and municipality in the district of Ansbach, in Bavaria, Germany. It is situated 14 km southeast of Ansbach.

References

Ansbach (district)